Henry Harvey (1743–1810)  was a British Royal Navy officer.

Henry Harvey may also refer to:

 Henry Harvey, builder of the Barnsley Mechanics Institute and Public Hall, now The Civic, Barnsley, in 1877
Henry Harvey (1812-1887), son of Thomas Harvey (Royal Navy officer)
Henry Harvey (assemblyman) in 58th New York State Legislature
Henry Harvey (astronomer) on List of Fellows of the Royal Society G, H, I
Henry Harvey (lawyer) (died 1585), English lawyer
Henry Stephen Harvey (1889–?), American architect

See also

Harry Harvey (disambiguation)
Henry Hervey (disambiguation), pronounced Harvey